Roger Federer defeated Rafael Nadal in the final, 2–6, 6–7(4–7), 7–6(7–5), 6–3, 6–1 to win the men's singles tennis title at the 2005 Miami Open. It was the first of 24 tournament-final matches between the pair. Federer completed the Sunshine Double with the win; it would be the first of three Sunshine Doubles in his career (followed by 2006 and 2017).

Andy Roddick was the defending champion, but retired from his second-round match due to a wrist injury.

Seeds 
All thirty-two seeds received a bye to the second round.

  Roger Federer (champion)
  Andy Roddick (second round, retired because of a wrist injury)
  Marat Safin (third round)
  Guillermo Coria (third round)
  Carlos Moyà (third round)
  Tim Henman (quarterfinals)
  Gastón Gaudio (fourth round)
  David Nalbandian (third round)
  Andre Agassi (semifinals)
  Joachim Johansson (second round)
  Guillermo Cañas (second round)
  Tommy Robredo (third round, withdrew because of a neck injury)
  Ivan Ljubičić (fourth round)
  Nikolay Davydenko (second round)
  Fernando González (third round)
  Tommy Haas (third round)
  Mikhail Youzhny (second round)
  Mario Ančić (fourth round)
  Feliciano López (second round)
  Andrei Pavel (second round)
  Vincent Spadea (third round)
  Nicolas Kiefer (second round)
  Radek Štěpánek (fourth round)
  Jiří Novák (fourth round)
  Thomas Johansson (quarterfinals)
  Dominik Hrbatý (quarterfinals)
  Sébastien Grosjean (third round)
  Juan Ignacio Chela (third round)
  Rafael Nadal (final)
  Paradorn Srichaphan (second round)
  Taylor Dent (quarterfinals)
  Xavier Malisse (second round)

Draw

Finals

Top half

Section 1

Section 2

Section 3

Section 4

Bottom half

Section 5

Section 6

Section 7

Section 8

External links
 2005 NASDAQ-100 Open draw
 2005 NASDAQ-100 Open Qualifying draw

2005 NASDAQ-100 Open
NASDAQ-100 Open